Jacqueline Florence Olive "Jackie" Whitney (married name Williams; born 5 February 1943) is an English former cricketer who played as a right-handed batter. She appeared in three Test matches for England in 1966, in a test series against New Zealand. She played domestic cricket for Surrey.

References

External links
 
 

1943 births
Living people
England women Test cricketers
Surrey women cricketers